Sharon L. Wood is an American structural engineer, currently executive vice president and provost of the University of Texas at Austin.

Biography
Wood is the descendant of three generations of civil engineers, and began her interest in engineering at age eight when she visited a construction site with her father. She graduated from the University of Virginia in 1982, and has a Ph.D. in civil engineering from the University of Illinois at Urbana–Champaign, which she earned with the support of a Tau Beta Pi fellowship.

The University of Illinois hired her as a faculty member directly after she completed her doctorate, and she remained there as a faculty member for ten years before moving to the University of Texas in 1996. She was named dean in 2014, after a year as interim dean.

She was the first woman at the university to chair the Department of Civil, Architectural and Environmental Engineering, and the first woman to become dean of engineering. Her accomplishments as dean include significantly increasing the number of women both among the faculty of the school and in its students.

Recognition
She was elected to the National Academy of Engineering in 2013 "for design of reinforced concrete structures and associated seismic instrumentation for extreme loadings and environments". She is also a Fellow of the American Society of Civil Engineers, which gave her their Alfred Noble Prize in 1993 and their Outstanding Projects and Leaders (OPAL) Award in Education in 2018.

The University of Virginia named Wood their distinguished alumna for 2018. Hart Energy and their Oil and Gas Investor magazine gave Wood their Pinnacle Award in 2020.

References

Year of birth missing (living people)
Living people
American structural engineers
American women engineers
University of Virginia School of Engineering and Applied Science alumni
Grainger College of Engineering alumni
University of Illinois Urbana-Champaign faculty
University of Texas at Austin faculty
Fellows of the American Society of Civil Engineers
Members of the United States National Academy of Engineering
American women academics
21st-century American women